The sixth season of the CBS police procedural series The Mentalist, created by Bruno Heller, premiered on September 29, 2013 and concluded on May 18, 2014.

Cast and characters

Main cast
 Simon Baker as Patrick Jane (22 episodes)
 Robin Tunney as Teresa Lisbon (22 episodes)
 Tim Kang as Kimball Cho (22 episodes)
 Owain Yeoman as Wayne Rigsby (13 episodes)
 Amanda Righetti as Grace Van Pelt (13 episodes)
 Rockmond Dunbar as Dennis Abbott (16 episodes)
 Emily Swallow as Kim Fischer (14 episodes)

Recurring cast
 Michael Gaston as Gale Bertram (5 episodes)
 Drew Powell as FBI Agent Reede Smith (4 episodes)
 Reed Diamond as Ray Haffner (3 episodes)
 Titus Welliver as Michael Ridley (2 episodes)
 Xander Berkeley as Sheriff Thomas McAllister (4 episodes)
 William Mapother as Richard Haibach (3 episodes)
 Joe Adler as Jason Wiley (13 episodes)
 Pedro Pascal as FBI Agent Marcus Pike (6 episodes)

Notable guest stars
 Malcolm McDowell as Bret Stiles ("Fire and Brimstone")
 Pruitt Taylor Vince as J.J. LaRoche ("Black Helicopters")
 Aunjanue Ellis as  Madeleine Hightower ("Red Listed")
 Jack Plotnick as Brett Partridge ("The Desert Rose")
 Kevin Corrigan as Bob Kirkland ("Red Listed")
 Emmanuelle Chriqui as Lorelei Martins ("The Desert Rose", flashback episode)

Production
CBS announced that it had renewed The Mentalist for a sixth season on March 27, 2013. It was revealed in July 2013 that the mystery of Red John would be revealed before the end of 2013.

On August 7, 2013, it was announced that characters Wayne Rigsby and Grace Van Pelt, played by Owain Yeoman and Amanda Righetti, both of whom had been on the series since the first episode, would be leaving. Emily Swallow and Rockmond Dunbar were cast as Kim Fischer and Dennis Abbott, two recurring characters with the potential to become series regulars. Dunbar was promoted to series regular on October 18, 2013, three weeks before his first episode had been broadcast. On November 15, Swallow was likewise promoted to series regular before her first appearance was aired.

Righetti and Yeoman's final episode, "White as the Driven Snow", aired on March 23, 2014.

Filming locations 
The first episode of the season "The Desert Rose" was filmed in Bombay Beach, California. The production team created a sign for the fictional "Borrego Gas Diner" to stand-in for the local bar and restaurant Ski Inn.

Home release 
All 22 episodes were included on the five disc complete sixth season set. It was released on September 20, 2014 in Region 1, October 20, 2014 in Region 2, and October 8, 2014 in Region 4. It included the featurette "Patrick Jane: Redeemed, Recovered, Restored" and unaired scenes.

Episodes

U.S. ratings

References

External links
 
 
 

2013 American television seasons
2014 American television seasons
The Mentalist seasons